Laser War is the first pinball machine that was produced by Data East Pinball. It was also the first pinball machine to
feature digital stereo sound.

References

External links
Internet Pinball Database entry for Laser War

1987 pinball machines
Data East pinball machines